Nikolay Zubov may refer to:

 Nikolay Alexandrovich Zubov (1763-1805), Russian nobleman
 Nikolay Nikolaevich Zubov (1885-1960),  Russian naval officer and oceanographer 
 Nikolay Zubov (icebreaker), see Project 23550 patrol ship